Samuel S. Ferster (March 15, 1898 – March 28, 1967) was an American attorney and Republican Party politician who served in the New Jersey General Assembly from 1938 to 1941, and later served as a Judge of the New Jersey Workers Compensation Court.

Early years
Ferster grew up in Newark and Rahway. He graduated City College of New York and New Jersey Law School. He served in the U.S. Air Force during World War I from 1917 to 1919. He was a member of the 612th Aero Squadron.

Political career
In 1937, he was elected to the New Jersey State Assembly, representing Essex County. Among the incumbent Democrats he defeated in that election was Leo P. Carlin, who would go on to serve as Mayor of Newark. He was re-elected in 1938, 1939, 1940, and 1941. Among the Democrats he defeated in 1940 were Peter W. Rodino, who would go on to serve 40 years as a Congressman, and John J. Francis, who would serve fourteen years as an Associate Justice of the New Jersey Supreme Court.

During his nearly four years as an Assemblyman, Ferster served as Chairman of the Assembly Labor Committee.

Ferster led a protest of Nazi persecution of minorities in Orange, New Jersey on February 25, 1939.

In 1940, Governor A. Harry Moore signed legislation sponsored by Ferster that required New Jersey students to attend school at least until the age of 16, and prohibited children under the age of 12 from working.

Governor Charles Edison appointed him to serve as a Commissioner of the North Jersey District Water Supply Commission in 1941. He resigned from the State Assembly in July 1941, following his confirmation by the New Jersey State Senate.

In 1951, Ferster joined the Administration of Governor Alfred Driscoll as the Deputy Commissioner of the New Jersey Department of Labor and as Director of the Division of Compensation.

Governor Robert B. Meyner appointed Ferster to serve as a Judge of the New Jersey Workers Compensation Court.

Following his death in 1967, friends and colleagues established the Samuel J. Ferster Scholarship at Rutgers University Law School.

Electoral history

New Jersey General Assembly (1940)
12 Seats Elected At-Large from Essex County

References

1898 births
1967 deaths
Politicians from Newark, New Jersey
City College of New York alumni
Rutgers School of Law–Newark alumni
United States Army Air Service pilots of World War I
Republican Party members of the New Jersey General Assembly
Jewish American state legislators in New Jersey
20th-century American politicians
20th-century American Jews
Military personnel from New Jersey